Luigi Salerno (1924–1992) was an Italian historian of Italian art and historiographer. He is particularly known as a scholar of the Italian baroque and Salvator Rosa, with expertise on the 17th century, including Guercino and Caravaggio.

Luigi Salerno was a student of Lionello Venturi. He went to London in 1948 and in 1949, working with the Warburg Institute. In 1953 he married Elda Campana. He received a prize for his work studying the links between the English and Italian art in 1600–1700. This work was appreciated by Rudolf Wittkower. He won the Fulbright prize and in London he started a prolific relation with Denis Mahon.

In the early 1960s, in collaboration with Mahon, he authenticated two Caravaggio paintings in American museums: “Martha and Mary Magdalene” (Detroit Institute of Arts) and “The Crucifixion of Saint Andrew” (Cleveland Museum of Art).

In 1965 Luigi Salerno was a professor at Penn State University in the United States.

References

External links 
Finding Aid for the Luigi Salerno research papers, 1948-1996 at the Getty Research Institute. Includes biographical information and list of archival holdings.

1924 births
1992 deaths
Italian art historians
20th-century  Italian historians
Italian expatriates in the United Kingdom